Strata-East Records is an American record company and label specialising in jazz founded in 1971 by Charles Tolliver and Stanley Cowell with the release of their first recording Music Inc. The label released over 50 albums in the 1970s. Many of the label's releases are now hailed as prime examples of 1970s post-bop, spiritual jazz, and afro-jazz.

Gil Scott-Heron recorded his 1974 album Winter in America with Brian Jackson for Strata-East. "The Bottle" featured on the album, was a popular single. This album stands as one of the label's best-known recordings.

Clifford Jordan and Bill Lee, father of Spike Lee, were involved in many releases.

Discography

SES Series

SECD Series
SECD 9001 (Bellaphon 660-51-004) - Charles Tolliver Music Inc & Orchestra - Impact, recorded January 17, 1975, released on CD 1990.
SECD 9002 (Bellaphon 660-51-002) - John Hicks - Hells Bells, Recorded May 21, 1975, released on CD 1990.
SECD 9003 (Bellaphon 660-51-001) - Charles Tolliver - Live In Berlin At The Quasimodo/Vol.1, recorded July 21/22, 1988, released on CD 1990.
SECD 9004 (Bellaphon 660-51-008) - Stanley Cowell, Billy Harper, Reggie Workman, Billy Hart - Such Great Friends, recorded July 7, 1983, released on CD 1991.
SECD 9005 (Bellaphon 660-51-003) - The Heath Brothers Featuring Stanley Cowell - Marchin' On!, recorded 1975, released on CD 1990.
SECD 9006 (Bellaphon 660-51-005) - John Gordon - Step By Step, recorded September 22, 1975, released on CD 1990.
SECD 9008 (Bellaphon 660-51-010) - John Hicks  - Steadfast, recorded May 21, 1975, released on CD 1991.
SECD 9009 (Bellaphon 660-51-006) - Cecil McBee - Mutima, recorded May 8, 1974, released on CD 1991.
SECD 9010 (Bellaphon 660-51-009) - Charles Tolliver Music Inc & Big Band - Music Inc. & Big Band, recorded November 11, 1970, released on CD 1991.
SECD 9011 (Bellaphon 660-51-007) - Charles Tolliver Music Inc - Compassion, recorded November, 1977, released on CD 1991.
SECD 9012 (Bellaphon 660-51-012) - Charlie Rouse - Two Is One, recorded 1974, released on CD 1992.
SECD 9013 (Bellaphon 660-51-011) - Charles Tolliver - Live In Berlin At The Quasimodo/Vol.2, recorded July 21/22, 1988, released on CD 1992.
SECD 9014 (Bellaphon 660-51-013) - Larry Ridley - Sum Of The Parts, recorded June 1975, released on CD 1992.
SECD 9015 (Bellaphon 660-51-016) - Charles Tolliver Music Inc - Live In Tokyo, recorded December 7, 1973, released on CD 1992.
SECD 9016 (Bellaphon 660-51-014) - Music Inc - Live At Historic Slugs''', recorded May 1, 1970, released on CD 1992.
SECD 9017 (Bellaphon 660-51-015) - Gil Scott-Heron/Brian Jackson - Winter In America, recorded September/October 1973, released on CD 1992.
SECD 9018 (Bellaphon 660-51-020) - Larry Ridley & the Jazz Legacy Ensemble - Live at Rutgers University, recorded 1989, released on CD 1993.
SECD 9019 (Bellaphon 660-51-022) - Billy Harper - Capra Black, recorded 1973, released on CD 1993.
SECD 9020 (Bellaphon 660-51-017) - Clifford Jordan - Glass Bead Games Volume 1, recorded October 29, 1973, released on CD 1992.
SECD 9021 (Bellaphon 660-51-023) - Clifford Jordan - Glass Bead Games Volume 2, recorded October 29, 1973, released on CD 1993.
SECD 9022 (Bellaphon 660-51-018) - Pharoah Sanders - Izipho Zam, recorded January 14, 1969, released on CD 1993.
SECD 9024 (Bellaphon 660-51-021) - Cecil Payne - Zodiac, recorded December 16, 1968, released on CD 1993.
SECD 9026 (Bellaphon 660-51-019) - Charles Brackeen - Rhythm X, recorded January 26, 1968, released on CD 1993.
SECD 9028 (Bomba BOM542) - Stanley Cowell - Musa • Ancestral Streams, recorded December 10/11, 1973, released on CD 1996.
SECD 9031 (Bomba BOM545) - Shamek Farrah & Sonelius Smith - The World Of The Children'', recorded April, 1976, released on CD 1996.

See also 
 List of record labels

External links 
Official site

References

American record labels
Record labels established in 1971
Jazz record labels